František Jansa (born 12 September 1962) is a Czech former athlete who specialised in the pole vault. He represented Czechoslovakia at the 1983 World Championships finishing tenth in the final. In addition, he was the 1981 European Junior Championships gold medallist.

His personal bests in the event are 5.62 metres outdoors (Prague 1983) and 5.55 metres indoors (Prague 1985).

International competitions

References

1962 births
Living people
Czech male pole vaulters
Czechoslovak male pole vaulters
World Athletics Championships athletes for Czechoslovakia
Competitors at the 1986 Goodwill Games